The following lists events that happened in 1919 in Iceland.

Incumbents
Monarch - Kristján X
Prime Minister – Jón Magnússon

Events
15 November – Icelandic parliamentary election, 1919
1919 Úrvalsdeild

Births
25 February – Magnús Kjartansson, journalist, writer and politician (d. 1981).
2 June – Pétur Sigurgeirsson, bishop (d. 2010)
21 November – Helgi Hóseasson, carpenter, atheist and socialist (d. 2009)

Deaths

16 January – Björn M. Ólsen, scholar and politician (b. 1850).

References

 
1910s in Iceland
Iceland
Iceland
Years of the 20th century in Iceland